State Route 232 (SR 232, OH 232) is an east–west state highway situated in the southwestern corner of the U.S. state of Ohio.  The western terminus of State Route 232 is at a T-intersection with U.S. Route 52 in the unincorporated community of Point Pleasant near the Ohio River.  The eastern terminus of this highway is at a signalized intersection with State Route 125 in the village of Bethel.

Route description
All of State Route 232 lies within the southern part of Clermont County.  There are no segments of this highway that are included within the National Highway System.

History
This state highway made its debut in 1930 along the routing that it occupies to this day between Point Pleasant and Bethel.  No changes of major significance have taken place to State Route 232 since its inception.

Major intersections

References

See also

State Route 232 (1923)

232
Transportation in Clermont County, Ohio